B. cinnabarina may refer to:

 Baptodoris cinnabarina, a sea slug
 Brassia cinnabarina, a New World orchid